This is a list of NATO reporting name/ASCC names for bombers, with Soviet Union and Chinese designations. Bombers had names starting with the letter "B"; single-syllable words denoted propeller driven aircraft (piston and turboprop engines), while two syllable words were used for jets.

See also
NATO reporting name

bombers
NATO reporting names for bombers, List of